Spinning Coin is a studio album by the British bluesman John Mayall and The Bluesbreakers.

Track listing
All tracks composed by John Mayall; except where indicated
 "When the Devil Starts Crying" (Jim Lauderdale)
 "Spinning Coin" 
 "Ain't No Brakeman" (Fontaine Brown)
 "Double Life Feelings" 
 "Run" 
 "What Passes for Love" (David Grissom)
 "Fan the Flames" (John "Juke" Logan)
 "Voodoo Music" (Willie Dixon, J.B. Lenoir)
 "Long Story Short" (Michael Henderson, R.S. Field)
 "No Big Hurry" 
 "Remember This"

Personnel
The Bluesbrakers
 John Mayall - vocals, keyboards, harmonica
 Buddy Whittington - guitars
 Rick Cortes - bass guitar
 Joe Yuele - drums

Additional musicians
 Joe Sublett - horns on (1, 5, 7, 8, 9, 11)
 John "Juke" Logan - electric harmonics on 7
 R.S. Field - guitar on 9, percussion on 3 & 9
 Dave McNair - percussion on 3

Transcribed from an original album cover.

References

1995 albums
John Mayall albums